William Phillip Thomas was Archdeacon of Llandaff from 1998 to 2008.

Thomas was born in 1943 and educated at  Lichfield Theological College; and ordained in 1971. After  curacies in Llanilid and Pontypridd he was Vicar of Tonyrefail then Rector of Neath until his appointment as Archdeacon.

References

 

Alumni of Lichfield Theological College
Archdeacons of Llandaff
Living people
1943 births